Verchaix is a commune in the Haute-Savoie department in the Auvergne-Rhône-Alpes region in south-eastern France.

Geography
Verchaix is located on a small plateau above the north bank of the river Giffre.  The commune spans an altitude of 654m to 2092m.

Industry
There are a small number of hotels and restaurants and Verchaix is a summer and skiing holiday destination.

Name
The name Verchaix is taken from the verdant south-facing slopes that have traditionally been used in viticulture.

See also
Communes of the Haute-Savoie department

References

Communes of Haute-Savoie
Ski areas and resorts in France